Selina Scoble (born 18 October 1977) is an Australian female volleyball player. She was part of the Australia women's national volleyball team.

She competed with the national team at the 2000 Summer Olympics in Sydney, Australia, finishing 9th.

See also
 Australia at the 2000 Summer Olympics

References

External links

1977 births
Living people
Australian women's volleyball players
Sportspeople from Wellington City
Volleyball players at the 2000 Summer Olympics
Olympic volleyball players of Australia
Oregon State Beavers women's volleyball players
Expatriate volleyball players in the United States
Australian expatriate sportspeople in the United States